T. moritziana may refer to:

 Tayloria moritziana, a moss that has spore capsules with teeth that are arthrodontous
 Tillandsia moritziana, an air plant